The Corridor People is a British television series that was produced by Granada Television for the ITV network in 1966, devised and written by Edward Boyd.

A surreal black-and-white detective series, The Corridor People pitched security agent Kronk (John Sharp) against exotic villainess Syrie Van Epp (Elizabeth Shepherd) over the course of four episodes.

The series has been released on DVD in the form of electronic conversions from 405 to 625-line video.

Cast 
 Elizabeth Shepherd as Syrie Van Epp
 John Sharp as Kronk
 Gary Cockrell as Phil Scrotty
 Alan Curtis as Inspector Blood
 William Maxwell as Sergeant Hound
 Ian Trigger as Nonesuch

Episode list

References

External links 
 

ITV television dramas
1966 British television series debuts
1966 British television series endings
Television series by ITV Studios
Television shows produced by Granada Television
English-language television shows
Black-and-white British television shows
1960s British crime television series